Luki is a rural locality (a settlement) in Krinichenskoye Rural Settlement, Ostrogozhsky District, Voronezh Oblast, Russia. The population was 736 as of 2010. There are 9 streets.

Geography 
Luki is located 27 km northeast of Ostrogozhsk (the district's administrative centre) by road. Peski-Kharkovskiye is the nearest rural locality.

References 

Rural localities in Ostrogozhsky District